Rhagodia is a genus in the arachnid order Solifugae, comprising four species. R. abessinica is found in Ethiopia, while the other three species are found in the Near East, from Turkey to Pakistan.

References 

Solifugae genera
Fauna of Ethiopia
Arthropods of Turkey